Graphis tetralocularis is a species of crustose lichen in the family Graphidaceae. Found in Rwanda, it was formally described as a new species in 2005 by Christina Bock and Markus Hauck. It is only known to occur at the type locality, which is a dry forest dominated by the trees Nuxia floribunda, Haplocoelum gallense, and Strychnos usambarensis. The lichen has a thin, smooth, whitish grey to grey-green crustose thallus. The specific epithet tetralocularis refers to the unusual morphology of its four-chambered ascospores. Graphis tetralocularis contains trace amounts of atranorin, a secondary chemical that can be detected using the technique of thin-layer chromatography.

References

tetralocularis
Lichen species
Lichens described in 2005
Lichens of Rwanda